Illinois Route 100 (IL-100) is a  state highway in the southwest Illinois. It generally parallels the Illinois River. Starting in downtown Alton, it trends northward to Buckheart Township near Canton. It makes up much of the Illinois River Road, a U.S. National Scenic Byway.

Route description 

The southern end in Alton is at US 67 where Broadway, Landmarks, and Piasa Streets come together.  It follows the east bank of the Mississippi River and Illinois River through Grafton until Hardin, where it crosses the Joe Page Bridge across the Illinois River.  A portion of the Great River Road was on an old railroad alignment, which you can see parts of just north of Alton.  During periods of high water, this highway is susceptible to flooding.

North of Hardin, the highway follows the west bank of the Illinois River until the bridge near Florence.  From that point on, IL 100 follows mostly farmland on much higher ground until Beardstown, where it will cross the river a third and final time.  It will again follow the west bank of the Illinois River until US 136.  After meeting with US 24 in Duncan Mills, IL 100 and US 24 is cosigned until Lewistown.  North of Lewistown, IL 100 heads in a north-east alignment until its northern terminus with IL 78 near Dunfermline.

Illinois River Road 
Illinois Route 100 overlaps the Illinois River Road from Grafton to Detroit.

History 
IL 100 originally went from Godfrey from the intersection at Godfrey Road and Homer M. Adams Parkway (IL 111/US 67) to Grafton on the current IL 3.  In 1987, IL 3, 143, and 100 alignments were changed to their current routes in the River Bend (Illinois) area when the Homer M. Adams Parkway Extension was opened. On June 28, 2012, the Florence Bridge over the Illinois River was closed for at least 9 months by IDOT due to difficulties with the lifting mechanism that allows barge traffic to pass under the bridge. Inspections suggested that continued use of the lift span could harm the structural integrity of the bridge. As barges need to pass under the bridge, the lifting span was raised up and the bridge was closed. Motorists wishing to cross the river must use the signed detour utilizing Illinois Route 106, US Route 54, and Interstate 72/US Route 36. The bridge was repaired and reopened to traffic on April 22, 2013, only to be closed again for seven days of repairs after a barge collision on June 20, 2019.

Major intersections

References

External links 

 Illinois Highway Ends: Illinois Route 100
 National Scenic Byways

100
100
Transportation in Madison County, Illinois
Transportation in Fulton County, Illinois
Alton, Illinois
Transportation in Jersey County, Illinois
Transportation in Greene County, Illinois
Transportation in Calhoun County, Illinois
Transportation in Pike County, Illinois
Transportation in Scott County, Illinois
Transportation in Morgan County, Illinois
Transportation in Cass County, Illinois
Transportation in Schuyler County, Illinois